Kordasht (also known as Kūr Dasht) is a village in Nowjeh Mehr Rural District, Siah Rud District, Jolfa County, East Azerbaijan Province, Iran. At the 2006 census, its population was 420, in 103 families.

The Kordasht Castle and Kordasht Hammam are located in this village.

References 

Populated places in Jolfa County